American Soul may refer to:
 American Soul, a television series
 "American Soul", song from Songs of Experience (U2 album)
 American Soul, an album by Mick Hucknall
 American Soul, an album by Aaron Watson